The Asclepieion of Athens was the sanctuary built in honour of the gods Asclepius and Hygieia, located west of the Theatre of Dionysos and east of the Pelargikon wall on the southern escarpment of the Acropolis hill. It was one of several asklepieia in the ancient Greek world that served as rudimentary hospitals. It was founded in the year 419–18 BCE during the Peloponnesian War, perhaps as a direct result of the plague, by Telemachos Acharneas. His foundation is inscribed in the Telemachos Monument, a double-sided, marble column which is topped by reliefs depicting the arrival of the god in Athens from Epidaurus and his reception by Telemachos. The sanctuary complex consisted of the temple and the altar of the god as well as two galleries, the Doric stoa which served as a katagogion for overnight patients in the Asklepieion and their miraculous (through dreams) healing by the god, and the Ionic Stoa that served as a dining hall and lodging for the priests of Asclepius and their visitors.

The Doric stoa was built according to inscriptions in 300–299 BCE and was a two-storey building with 17 Doric columns on its facade. This is framed by the sacred spring at its eastern end and a pit lined with masonry at its western end. This source is a small cave in the rock, in which there lies the natural spring. The circular well or pit, a deep hollow with polygonal masonry built into the cliff face, was accessed from the second floor of the Doric stoa and dates to the last quarter of the 5th century. F Robert proposed that it was a place devoted to the celebration of Heroes in the Asklepeion during ta Heroa, which witnessed sacrifices to the chthonic gods and heroes, as testified epigraphically. 

The Ionian stoa, west of the temple, is also dated to the last quarter of the 5th century. The sanctuary on its west side was enclosed by a propylon for the visitors to access from the ancient promenade to the Asklepieion site. According to epigraphic evidence, the propylon was renovated in Roman times. 

At the beginning of the 6th c. CE, when Christian worship succeeded the ancient, all the monuments of Asclepius were demolished and the material incorporated into the complex of a large, three-aisled Early Christian basilica. In the Byzantine years (11th and 13th centuries) two smaller, single-aisled temples occupied the position of the basilica, while the latter of them functioned as the catholicon of a small monastery. Since 2002, partial restorations of the west end of the ground floor of the Doric Stoa façade, the room of the Sacred Cave on the first floor of the Doric Stoa and the temple of Asclepius have been performed.

Notes

Bibliography

 

 

Buildings and structures completed in the 4th century BC
Landmarks in Athens
Ancient Greek buildings and structures in Athens
Monuments and memorials in Greece
Late Classical Greece
Temples of Asclepius